The following is a list of notable people from Cedar Rapids, Iowa. This list includes people who were born, have lived, or worked there.

Arts
Douglas Barr, actor and vintner
Michael Boddicker, musician (distant cousin of Mike Boddicker, MLB player)
Marvin D. Cone, artist
Paul Conrad, Pulitzer Prize-winning cartoonist
Joshua Coyne, musician
Jim Cummins, NBC News correspondent, 1963 graduate of Regis High School
Geof Darrow, comic book artist
Michael Daugherty, classical composer
Don DeFore, actor and president of National Academy of Television Arts & Sciences
Bobby Driscoll, child actor, Treasure Island, Peter Pan
Mark Elliot, voice-over artist for Disney previews
Michael Emerson, actor, grew up in Toledo, Iowa
Paul Engle, poet
James Erwin, author 
Terry Farrell, actress
Ed Gorman, writer
John Hench, Disney animator and Imagineer
Harry Hershfield, cartoonist
Larry N. Jordan (born 1952), publisher, journalist, and author, launched weekly Cedar Rapids Press-American as a 15-year-old student
Bert Kelly, jazz musician
Ashton Kutcher, actor, star of films and TV's Two and a Half Men
Ron Livingston, actor, Office Space, Band of Brothers, grew up in Marion, Iowa
Byron McKeeby, artist
Conger Metcalf, artist
Dow Mossman, author
Matthew Reinhart, author and pop-up book artist
Megan Reinking, actor
Ann Royer, painter, sculptor
William L. Shirer, journalist and author
Riley Smith, actor
Carl Van Vechten, novelist and photographer
Brooks Wheelan (born 1986), stand-up comedian, featured player on Saturday Night Live
Elijah Wood, actor, The Lord of the Rings 
Grant Wood, famous painter (American Gothic)

Business 
Arthur A. Collins (1909–1987), inventor and founder of Collins Radio Company
Walter Donald Douglas, co-founder of Penick & Ford Starch Company, died on RMS Titanic
Bob Parsons, founder of Parsons Technology and Go Daddy
John Stuart, CEO of Quaker Oats
Mark Walter, CEO of Guggenheim Partners, co-owner of the Los Angeles Dodgers

Military
Salvatore Giunta US Army, first living recipient of Medal of Honor since Vietnam War
John O. Miner, U.S. Navy Rear Admiral
Paul Tibbets, pilot of B-29 Enola Gay that dropped atomic bomb on Hiroshima, Japan; lived in Cedar Rapids until 1927

Politics 
Lord Acton (1941–2010), British peer and politician
John Ely, member of Iowa General Assembly, instrumental in abolishing capital punishment in Iowa
T. Cooper Evans (1924–2005), American Congressman
Bourke B. Hickenlooper (1896–1971), Lieutenant Governor, 29th Governor of Iowa, 4-term U.S. Senator
Paul Tibbets, pilot of B-29 Enola Gay that dropped atomic bomb on Hiroshima, Japan; lived in Cedar Rapids until 1927
Terry Lutz, one-term mayor of Fort Dodge, Iowa and CEO of McClure Engineering Company

Science
Alexander Lippisch (1894–1976), aerodynamics pioneer and aircraft designer
Wright Brothers, Orville (1871–1948) and Wilbur (1867–1912), aviation pioneers, resided in Cedar Rapids in their youth

Sports
Katie Abrahamson-Henderson, head coach of the Georgia Lady Bulldogs basketball team
Adrian Arrington (born 1985), football player
Alanna Arrington, fashion model
Mike Boddicker, Major League Baseball pitcher (distant cousin of Michael Boddicker, musician)
Robert Bruggeman, football player
Pauly Burke, professional road cyclist
Landon Cassill, NASCAR racer
Ray Cheetany, UNLV football player, founder of RawTeams.com
Tim DeBoom, Ironman triathlon champion
Cal Eldred, baseball player
Phil Estes, college football coach
Kent Ferguson, Olympic diver, 1991 world champion
Ben Ford, baseball player
Joey Gase, NASCAR driver
Trent Green, NFL quarterback
Beulah Gundling, synchronized swimmer, aquatic artist, choreographer and author
Fred Jackson, NFL player for Buffalo Bills
Zach Johnson (born 1976), professional golfer, 2007 Masters champion, and the 2015 Open Championship winner.
Danielle Kahle (born 1989), figure skater
Aaron Kampman (born 1979), football player, 2-time All-Pro
Mitch Keller, baseball player, Pittsburgh Pirates
Bruce Kimm, baseball player, coach, and manager
Timothy LeDuc, figure skater
Pat Mason, All-American Girls Professional Baseball League player (1950 season)
George Nissen (1914–2010), three-time national AAU champion, 1935–37, developer of modern trampoline
Wes Obermueller, baseball player
Arthur D. Pennington, known as Art "Superman" Pennington, was a Negro league baseball star
Lance Rozeboom, USL Soccer player, Rochester Rhinos Former MLS Player, D.C. United
Scott Schebler, baseball player, Los Angeles Dodgers
Shawn Sedlacek, baseball player, Kansas City Royals
Ryan Sweeney, baseball player, Chicago Cubs
Dedric Ward, football player
Kurt Warner (born 1971), pro football quarterback, played in three Super Bowls, won Super Bowl XXXIV as Super Bowl MVP
Earl Whitehill, was a Major League Baseball pitcher. He played for the Detroit Tigers, during his career he won 218 games.
Marshal Yanda, NFL offensive lineman, Baltimore Ravens, Super Bowl champion Super Bowl XLVII

Other
Alanna Arrington, fashion model
Mark Elliott, former disc jockey, familiar for voicing Disney (among other companies) trailers and guest-hosting for American Top 40 with Casey Kasem.
George Greene, Iowa Supreme Court Justice
Šárka B. Hrbková (1878–1948), Czech-American Slavologist
Denise Stapley, winner of CBS show Survivor: Philippines
Sarah Lacina, winner of CBS show Survivor: Game Changers

References

Cedar Rapids
 
Cedar Rapids